Sardotsav or Sharadotsav is an annual winter cultural fest held in the western Himalayan towns of India. It is different from Sardotsav celebrated in West Bengal as part of Durga Puja. Sardotsav is a portmanteau of Sarad (winter) and Utsav (festival). Sardotsav festivals of Pithoragarh and Nainital are most prominent.

2014 in Pithoragarh
In 2014 Sardotsav took place on the first of November. Some of the key organizers were Chairman Nagar Palika Shri Jagat Singh Khati, District Magistrate Shri Shemwal and  Executive Officer of Nagar Palika Pithoragarh.

Headliners included Garhwali singer Gajender Sing Rana who contributed "Babli tero Mobile", a Garhwali song, Duplicate Dev Anand Kishore Bhanushali , Bollywood singer Nupur Pant, and Lata Mangeshkar of Uttarakhand  Meena Rana who sung Garhwali and Kumaoni songs.

Schools from different parts of the district also performed folk dances and songs. Various competitions like Quiz and Mehndi were held.

References

Festivals in India
Himalayan culture
Winter festivals